The men's high jump event at the 1994 World Junior Championships in Athletics was held in Lisbon, United States, at Estádio Universitário de Lisboa on 22 and 24 July.

Medalists

Results

Final
24 July

Qualifications
22 Jul

Group A

Group B

Participation
According to an unofficial count, 31 athletes from 23 countries participated in the event.

References

High jump
High jump at the World Athletics U20 Championships